Chak 38/JB Dabbora (Dagora or Riwaaz Abad) is a village located at the boundary of Faisalabad district, Punjab, Pakistan. Its zip code is 37521. 

The village is named according to the normal practice for a Chak (village) of Pakistani Punjab. The "JB" denotes Jhang Branch Canal, the source of the village's water supply.

Villages in Faisalabad District